Sadettin is the Turkish version of the Muslim name Sa'd al-Din. It may refer to:
 Sadettin Erbil (1925–1997), Turkish actor
 Sadettin Ergeç, Iraqi Turkmen politician
 Sadettin Heper (1899–1980), Turkish composer 
 Sadettin Kaynak (1895–1961), Turkish composer 

Turkish masculine given names